The National Aviation Heritage Area is a federally designated National Heritage Area consolidating more than fifteen aviation-related sites in the Dayton, Ohio area into a cooperative marketing and administrative framework. The National Heritage Area is centered on the activities of the Wright Brothers and their workshop at the Dayton Aviation Heritage National Historical Park, itself composed of several sites.

Major features of the Heritage Area include the National Museum of the United States Air Force, Grimes Field, Champaign Aviation Museum and the Neil Armstrong Air and Space Museum, as well as the Wright Cycle Company, Huffman Prairie Flying Field, Hawthorn Hill and Paul Laurence Dunbar State Memorial units of Dayton Aviation Heritage National Historical Park. Other cooperating organizations include the aviation archives of Wright State University, Woodland Cemetery and Arboretum, the Greene County Historical Society and local visitor centers.

The National Aviation Heritage Area was authorized in 2004 and is administered by the National Aviation Heritage Alliance.

References

External links
 National Aviation Heritage Area website
 National Aviation Heritage Area at the National Park Service

 
National Heritage Areas of the United States
2004 establishments in Ohio
Protected areas established in 2004
Dayton, Ohio
Wright State University